These are the most popular given names in the United States for each respective year in the 1980s.

References 
 Most Popular 1000 Names of the 1980s from the Social Security Administration

1980s
1980s in the United States